Gibberula pignonae is a species of sea snail, a marine gastropod mollusk, in the family Cystiscidae. It is named after Brazilian writer Nélida Piñon.

Description
The length of the shell attains 1.8 mm.

Distribution
This marine species occurs off Guadeloupe.

References

pignonae
Gastropods described in 2015